Charles Dow is the name of:

Charles Dow (1851–1902), American journalist
Charles E. Dow (1846–1919), American politician from Connecticut
Charles Dow Sr. (1931–2015), American politician from Maine
Charles W. Dow (died 1855), the first European murder victim in Kansas